The 2004 Wirral Metropolitan Borough Council election took place on 10 June 2004 to elect members of Wirral Metropolitan Borough Council in England. This election was held on the same day as other local elections.

The whole council was up for election due to boundary changes.

After the election, the composition of the council was:

Election results

Overall election result

Overall result compared with 2003.

Ward results

Bebington

Bidston and St James

Birkenhead and Tranmere

Bromborough

Clatterbridge

Claughton

Eastham

Greasby, Frankby and Irby

Heswall

Hoylake and Meols

Leasowe and Moreton East

Liscard

Moreton West and Saughall Massie

New Brighton

Oxton

Pensby and Thingwall

Prenton

Rock Ferry

Seacombe

Upton

Wallasey

West Kirby and Thurstaston

Changes between 2004 and 2006

Notes

• bold denotes the winning candidate

References 

2004 English local elections
2004
2000s in Merseyside